The FIS Alpine World Ski Championships 1931 were held 19–23 February in Mürren, Switzerland. These were the inaugural world championships for alpine skiing organized by the International Ski Federation (FIS), and consisted of downhill and slalom events for men and women.

Participating nations

Men's competitions

Slalom

Downhill 

2 February 1931 (started 25, finished 25).

Medal summary

Men's events

Women's events

Medal table
Host nation is highlighted

See also
 Italy at the FIS Alpine World Ski Championships 1931

References

External links
FIS-Ski.com – Alpine skiing – 1931 World Championships

 
1931 in alpine skiing
1931 in Swiss sport
1931
International sports competitions hosted by Switzerland
Alpine skiing competitions in Switzerland
February 1931 sports events